The Wheeler-Harrington House is a historic house located at 249 Harrington Avenue in Concord, Massachusetts.

Description and history 
The -story timber-frame house was probably built around 1742, around the time of the marriage of Josiah and Mary Wheeler. It is the oldest known building in West Concord. For thirty years (1877 to 1907) the farm was operated and maintained by his daughter, Lucy Harrington. In the 20th century, the farmstead was for fifty years in the hands of a single family, the LeBallisters, who operated a horse farm on land that had been reduced by subdivision. The house was restored by volunteers, and has since been rented by the town to tenant farmers.

The house was listed on the National Register of Historic Places on July 23, 2013.

See also
National Register of Historic Places listings in Concord, Massachusetts
National Register of Historic Places listings in Middlesex County, Massachusetts

References

Houses completed in 1742
Houses on the National Register of Historic Places in Concord, Massachusetts
Houses in Concord, Massachusetts
1742 establishments in Massachusetts